Macbeth: tre atti senza nome is an opera by Salvatore Sciarrino that received its premiere in Frankfurt in 2002 in a production by Achim Freyer. Although the work is based on endless permutation of a few simple recitation-figures, Sciarrino worked on the opera for 25 years.

Recording
Otto Katzameier, Macbeth, Anna Radziejewska, Lady Macbeth, Richard Zook, Banquo/Ghost/Attendant, Sonia Turchetta, Soldier/Banquo's Son/Murderer/Messenger, Thomas Mehnert, Duncan/Gentleman/Macduff. Vokalensemble NOVA Klangforum Wien, cond. Evan Christ, Col Legno 2CDs

References

Operas
2002 operas
Operas by Salvatore Sciarrino